Kung Fu High School is an action/romance novel written by Ryan Gattis. The book explores the mind of a young girl named Jen who, along with her brother Cue and legendary martial artist cousin, Jimmy Chang, attends Kung Fu High School, where a powerful drug kingpin named Ridley pits all students against each other in order to maintain control over his corrupt business he runs using the students he controls. Jimmy Chang, just having come from the most prestigious martial arts academy in Hong Kong with a record of 2,412 wins and zero losses and no hits scored on him on all of his tournaments, is pulled into the mess that is Kung Fu High School, and Jen's life. However, Jimmy has promised his mother never to engage in a fight, after leaving four thugs on the ground during an attempted assault. The only thing wrong with that promise, is the fact that Kung Fu High School's acceptance rule is to get "kicked in", a violent ritual where all students, being a martial artist in one way or another, gang up to beat on people, and nobody, not even the legendary Jimmy Chang, can get past this rule.

Plot
Jen, a teenage girl, and her brother Kyuzo, or Cue as she calls him, attend Martin Luther King High School, nicknamed "Kung Fu High School". However, due to the notorious Ridley's drug trafficking through the school, it has become a rundown war zone for both his workers and those who despise him. The only thing things these students at Kung Fu have in common are their ability to fight, or rather survive, and the fact that they've all been "kicked in". A welcoming practice at Kung Fu where students are beaten by everyone in order to teach them they are in the school.

The story starts off with Jen living an already irregular life, having to literally put on armor before going to school. One day Jen's long-lost cousin Jimmy Chang arrives at her front door, sent by her late mother's sister.

References
 
 

2005 novels
Fictional martial arts
Urban fiction